The 1995 Züri-Metzgete was the 80th edition of the Züri-Metzgete road cycling one day race. It was held on 20 August 1995 as part of the 1995 UCI Road World Cup. The race took place between the cities of Basel and Zürich was won by Johan Museeuw of Belgium.

Result

References 

Züri-Metzgete
Züri-Metzgete
Züri-Metzgete